Frank Garner is an American former Chief of Police, security consultant, and politician from Montana. Garner is a Republican member of the Montana House of Representatives for District 7, which includes parts of Kalispell, Montana.

Education 
In 1995, Garner earned a Criminal Justice/Criminology degree from Flathead Valley Community College. Garner attended Montana Law Enforcement Academy and FBI Regional Leadership Training Group.

Career 
In 1986, Garner became a police detective. In 1998, Garner became the Chief of Police in Kalispell Police Department, until 2006.

In 2004, Garner was appointed as the interim city manager of Kalispell, Montana.

In 2011, Garner became the Chief of Security at Kalispell Regional Healthcare. In 2017, Garner became a Security and Law Enforcement Consultant.

On November 4, 2014, Garner won the election and became a Republican member of Montana House of Representatives for District 7. On November 8, 2016, as an incumbent, Garner won the election and continued serving District 7. Garner defeated Lynn R. Stanley with 65.17% of the votes. On November 6, 2018, as an incumbent,  Garner won the election and continued serving District 7. Garner defeated James H. Cossitt with 65.46% of the votes.

Awards 
 2006 Great Chief Award. Presented by Kalispell Chamber of Commerce.
 2014 FVCC Distinguished Alumni Award. Presented by Flathead Valley Community College.

Personal life 
Garner's wife is Teresa Garner. They have three children.

See also 
 Montana House of Representatives, District 7

References

External links 
 Frank Garner at ballotpedia.org
 Frank Garner at meic.org

American police chiefs
Living people
Politicians from Kalispell, Montana
Republican Party members of the Montana House of Representatives
Year of birth missing (living people)
21st-century American politicians